Amédée is a French masculine forename. Notable people with the forename include:

Persons 
 Amédée, stage name of Philippe de Chérisey (1923-1985), French writer, radio humorist, surrealist and actor
Amédée Artus (1815-1892), French conductor and composer
Amédée Baillot de Guerville (1869–1913), French war correspondent
Amédée de Béjarry (1840-1916), French politician
Amédée Bollée (1844-1917), French bellfounder and inventor
Amédée Borrel (1867-1936), French biologist
Amédée Courbet (1827-1885), French army admiral
Amédée Dechambre (1812-1886), French physician
Amédée Despans-Cubières (1786-1853), French army general
Amédée Domenech (1933-2003), French rugby union player and politician
Amédée Dumontpallier (1826-1899), French gynecologist
Amédée Dunois (1878-1945), French lawyer, journalist, politician
Amédée Faure (1801-1878), French painter
Amédée Fengarol (1905-1951), French politician
Amédée E. Forget (1847-1923), Canadian lawyer, civil servant, politician
Amédée Forestier (1854 – 1930), French-British artist
Amédée Fournier (1912-1992), French bicycle racer
Amédée Gaboury (1838-1912), Canadian physician and politician
Amédée Galzin (1853-1925), French gynecologist
Amédée Geoffrion (1867-1935), Canadian lawyer and politician
Amédée Gibaud (1885-1957), French chess player
Amédée Girod de l'Ain (1781-1847), French lawyer and politician
Amédée Gordini (1899-1979), Italian-born French race car driver and manufacturer
Amédée Gosselin (1863-1941), Canadian historian, Roman Catholic priest
Amédée Gratton (?-?), Léonidas Gratton's father and husband of Hélène Foisy.
Amédée Guillemin (1826-1893), French science writer and journalist
Amédée Henri Guillemin (1860-1941), French WWI general
Amédée Jacques (1813-1865), French-Argentine pedagogue
Amédée de Jallais (1826-1909), French playwright, opera librettist
Amédée Joullin (1862–1917), French-American painter
Amédée Emmanuel François Laharpe (1754-1796), French army general
Amédée Louis Michel le Peletier, comte de Saint-Fargeau (1770-1845), French entomologist
Amédée Lynen (1852–1938), Belgian painter
Amédée Maingard (1918 - 1981), Mauritius-born French military personnel
Amédée Mannheim (1831-1906), French mathematician
Amédée Melanson (1882-1930), Canadian politician
Amédée Méreaux (1802-1874), French musicologist, pianist, composer
Amédée Ozenfant (1886-1966), French painter
Amédée de Noé (1818-1879), French caricaturist, lithographer
Amédée Papineau (1819-1903), Canadian writer
Amédée Pichot (1795-1877), French historian and translator
Amédée Pofey, 13th-century lord and knight
Amédée Wilfrid Proulx (1932-1993), American Roman Catholic bishop
Amédée Rolland (1914-2000), French racing cyclist
Amédée Ronzel (1909-?), French bobsledder
Amédée Thierry (1797-1873), French journalist and historian
Amédée Thubé (1884-1941), French sailor
Amédée Tremblay (1876-1949), Canadian organist, composer
Amédée Trichard, French long-distance runner
Amédée Turner (born 1929), British barrister
Jean-Amédée Gibert (1869–1945), French painter, architect, and curator

See also

 Amadea (disambiguation)
 Amadee (disambiguation)
 Amedeo (disambiguation)
 Amadeus (disambiguation)
 
 

Given names
French masculine given names